The women's 25 metre pistol competition at the 2006 Asian Games in Doha, Qatar was held on 5 December at the Lusail Shooting Range.

Schedule
All times are Arabia Standard Time (UTC+03:00)

Records

Results
Legend
DNF — Did not finish

Qualification

Final

References 

ISSF Results Overview
Results

External links
Official website

Women Pistol 25